Coyanosa is an unincorporated desert village in Pecos County, Texas, located in the Permian Basin in West Texas, United States. Its population was 163 at the 2010 census. Part of the Coyanosa Draw runs adjacent to the town, 2.2 miles to the west. There is a food store, two Mexican restaurants, a public library, an RV park and a post office at Coyanosa by way of businesses and services. 

Coyanosa is mentioned as the hometown of the main character in the book "The man from Coyanosa" (1998) by Lauran Paine.

People from Coyanosa are called Coyanosans.

Coyanosa is the dominant portion of a same-named census-designated place (CDP).

History
Coyanosa was originally settled as a ranching community in the early 1900s. A post office was established in 1908, but was discontinued 10 years later. Further development of the community resumed in the 1950s, as numerous water wells were drilled in the area to irrigate nearby cotton farms. By 1958, around 200 people lived in Coyanosa. The post office reopened, and by the early 1960s, the population had risen to 600. Increasing fuel prices in the mid-1970s made irrigation unprofitable and forced many area cotton farms out of business. A decline in the number of inhabitants soon followed. By 1990, Coyanosa had around 270 people. That figure had fallen to 138 by 2000.

Geography
Coyanosa is located at  (31.240532, -103.066121). It is situated south of the intersection of Farm Roads 1776 and 1450, approximately 26 miles northwest of Fort Stockton in northwestern Pecos County.

Climate
According to bestplaces.net, Coyanosa has on average 261 sunny days out of the year, averages 2 inches of snow a year, and 14 inches of rain on average per year. July is the hottest month for Coyanosa with an average high temperature of 97.7°, which ranks it as warmer than most places in Texas. January has the coldest nighttime temperatures for Coyanosa with an average of 28.3°. This is one of the coldest places in Texas.

Demographics
Coyanosa has been part of its namesake CDP since 1980 and, as such, no census information since then is available for the village alone. As of the census of 2000, 138 people, 46 households, and 39 families were  residing in the CDP. The population density was 1,153.3 people per square mile (444.0/km2). The 59 housing units  averaged 493.1/sq mi (189.8/km2). The racial makeup of the CDP was 100.00% White. Hispanics or Latinos of any race were 85.51% of the population.

Of the 46 households,  45.7% had children under the age of 18 living with them, 67.4% were married couples living together, 15.2% had a female householder with no husband present, and 15.2% were not families. About 10.9% of all households were made up of individuals, and none had someone living alone who was 65  or older. The average household size was 3.00, and the average family size was 3.18.

In the CDP, the age distribution was 31.9% under the age of 18, 10.9% from 18 to 24, 19.6% from 25 to 44, 28.3% from 45 to 64, and 9.4% who were 65 or older. The median age was 34 years. For every 100 females, there were 100.0 males. For every 100 females age 18 and over, there were 95.8 males.

Males had a median income of $38,393 versus $48,750 for females. The per capita income for the CDP was $7,974. There were 36.4% of families and 41.9% of the population living below the poverty line, including 37.0% of under eighteens and 36.4% of those over 64.

Government and infrastructure
The United States Postal Service operates the Coyanosa Post Office. Coyanosa is under the jurisdiction of the municipality of Fort Stockton, the county seat of Pecos County.

Education
Coyanosa is served by the Fort Stockton Independent School District.

Religion
There is only one church in Coyanosa, the St. Isidore Catholic Church. It is a parish under the Roman Catholic Diocese of San Angelo.

Petroleum
Coyanosa is also on the site of an oil field, having wells going down as much as 2 miles.

References

External links
 Coyanosa in the Handbook of Texas

Census-designated places in Pecos County, Texas
Census-designated places in Texas